Halfway to Heaven is the second studio album by American country music singer Brantley Gilbert. It was released on March 16, 2010, through Average Joes Entertainment. As of January 2015, the album has sold 1,081,200 copies. The original album was produced by Gilbert along with the Atom Brothers, Jonathan Waggoner, and Jess Franklin, except for "Country Must Be Country Wide" (produced by Dann Huff) and "Dirt Road Anthem Revisited" (produced by Phive Starr Productions).

Track listing

2011: Halfway to Heaven (Deluxe edition)

The deluxe version of the album was released on September 13, 2011 via Valory Music Group. This re-release featured remixes of all the tracks, as well as several new tracks that were not on the original version of the album.

Track listing

Personnel
A.J. Adams – dobro, pedal steel guitar
The Atom Brothers – acoustic guitar, electric guitar, background vocals
Randall Bramblett – Hammond B-3 organ, piano
Andy Carlson – fiddle, viola, violin, string arrangements
Davis Causey – electric guitar
Eric Darken – percussion
Will Doughty – piano, Hammond B-3 organ
Dan Dugmore – pedal steel guitar, lap steel guitar
Rachel Farley – background vocals
Colt Ford – vocals on "Dirt Road Anthem (Revisited)"
Jess Franklin – dobro, electric guitar, Hammond B-3 organ, slide guitar, background vocals
Paul Franklin – pedal steel guitar
Brantley Gilbert – acoustic guitar, lead vocals
Gerry Hansen – drums
Brandon Hicks – background vocals
Dann Huff – acoustic guitar
John Keane – pedal steel guitar
John Merlino – electric guitar
Tom Ryan – background vocals
Ben Sims – drums
Jane Van Voorhis – cello
Jonathan Waggoner – bass guitar, acoustic guitar

Charts

Weekly charts

Year-end charts

Singles

A Did not enter the Hot 100 but charted on Bubbling Under Hot 100 Singles.

Certifications

References

2010 albums
Brantley Gilbert albums
Average Joes Entertainment albums
Big Machine Records albums
Albums produced by Dann Huff